Lee Jang-ho (born May 15, 1945) is a South Korean film director and screenwriter.

Filmography 
Heavenly Homecoming to Stars (1974) - director
It Rained Yesterday (1974) - director 
You Become a Star, Too (1975) - director
Yes, Goodbye for Today (1976) - director, screenwriter
A Fine, Windy Day (1980) - director, screenwriter
Children of Darkness Part 1, Young-ae the Songstress (1981) - director, screenwriter
They Shot the Sun  (1982) - director, screenwriter
Come Unto Down (1982) - director, screenwriter
The Green Pine Tree (1983) - director
Widow Dance (1984) - director, screenwriter
Declaration of Fools (1984) - director
Between the Knees (1984) - director, screenwriter  
Eoudong (1985) - director 
Lee Jang-ho's Baseball Team (1986) - director, producer 
Y's Experience (1987) - director, producer 
The Man with Three Coffins (1987) - director, screenwriter, producer 
Gam-dong (1988) - producer
Lee Jang-ho's Alien Baseball Team 2 (1988) - producer
Miss Rhino and Mr. Korando (1989)  - director
The Story Inside the Handbag (1991) - producer
The Room in the Forest (1992) - producer
Myong-Ja Akiko Sonia (1992) - director
Declaration of Genius (1995) - director, screenwriter
Hakuna Matata - A Story of Jirani (documentary, 2010) - actor
A Journey with Korean Masters (2013) - director, screenwriter
God's Eye View (2014) - director

Awards 
1980 19th Grand Bell Awards: Best Director (A Fine, Windy Day)
1982 21st Grand Bell Awards: Best Director (Come Unto Down)
2022 27th Chunsa International Film Festival: Achievement Award

References

External links 
 
 
 

1945 births
Living people
South Korean film directors
South Korean screenwriters